Fitzroy Richard Somerset, 4th Baron Raglan FRAI (10 June 1885 – 14 September 1964) was a British soldier, author, and amateur anthropologist. His books include The Hero, A Study in Tradition, Myth and Drama and Monmouthshire Houses, with Cyril Fox.

Life
FitzRoy Richard Somerset, heir to the title of Baron Raglan, was born on 10 June 1885 to George Fitzroy Henry Somerset, 3rd Baron Raglan and his wife Lady Ethel Jemima Ponsonby. He was educated at Sandroyd School, Eton and the Royal Military College, Sandhurst, and received a commission as Second lieutenant in the Militia regiment the Royal Monmouthshire Royal Engineers on 10 June 1902. In 1905 he entered the British Army and was commissioned in the Grenadier Guards. His military career included working as an aide-de-camp to the governor of Hong Kong, service in the Egyptian army from 1913 to 1919, district commissioner in Sudan and as a political officer in Palestine and Transjordan. In recognition of his services in Egypt he was made an Officer of the Order of the Nile. He retired from the Army in 1922 as a major.

With the death of his father in 1921, he assumed the title 4th Baron Raglan and, after retiring from the army, returned to his ancestral home, Cefntilla Court near Usk in Monmouthshire. Very active in local affairs, he was a Justice of the Peace for the county as early as 1909 and served for twenty-one years (1928–49) as a member of the former Monmouthshire county council. He took a great interest in the Boy Scout movement, was county commissioner for Monmouthshire for 27 years (1927–54), and served as Lord Lieutenant of Monmouthshire from 1942 until 1964.

During his life he studied and wrote on topics such as anthropology, political science, and architecture. His interest in the antiquities of Monmouthshire led him, with Sir Cyril Fox, to write three volumes on the county's medieval and later domestic architecture, Monmouthshire Houses. In 1933 he became president of Section H (Anthropology) of the British Association for the Advancement of Science, and from 1945 to 1947 he served as president of the Folklore Society. Chairman of the art and archaeology committee of the National Museum of Wales (1949–51) and president of the National Museum of Wales from 1957 to 1962, he was also president of the Royal Anthropological Institute from 1955 to 1957.

On 9 April 1923 Raglan married Julia Hamilton (7 January 1901 – 17 April 1971), daughter of Lt.-Col. Robert Hamilton-Udny, 11th Lord Belhaven and Stenton by his marriage to Kathleen Gonville Bromhead. The Lord and Lady Raglan had five children, the first of whom died a few days after birth.  Julia, Lady Raglan also contributed to the study of folklore. In an article in the journal Folklore in 1939, she coined the term "Green Man" to describe the foliate heads found in English churches. Her theory on their origin is still debated.

Lord Raglan was the source of various controversies over the course of his life. In 1938 he declared his wish to give up his job at the Ministry of Information on the grounds that he was not doing enough work to justify his salary. In 1958 he agitated Welsh nationalist feelings by declaring Welsh a 'moribund' language. Demands were made for his resignation from the National Museum of Wales, but he stood fast. (The motto of the Raglan barony is Mutare vel timere sperno: 'I scorn to change or to fear').

Lord Raglan died on 14 September 1964.

Literary works
Not only an active member of many societies and interested in administrative duties in national institutions, Lord Raglan also published a number of books and papers on archaeology and anthropology. His first book, Jocasta's Crime – An Anthropological Study, a study of incest and incest taboos, was published in 1933. He followed with The Science of Peace, a work on the origin, development, and prevention of war.
  
Lord Raglan's work, The Hero, a Study in Tradition, Myth and Drama was published in 1936. The book's central thesis is that hero figures of mythology have their origin in ritual drama, not historical fact. In the book's most influential chapter, he outlines 22 common traits of god-heroes which he calls the "mythic hero archetype". Raglan then encapsulates the lives of several heroes and awards points (marks) for thematic elements for a possible score of 22.  He dissects Oedipus, Theseus, Romulus, Heracles, Perseus, Jason, Bellerophon, Pelops, Asclepios, Dionysos, Apollo, Zeus, Joseph, Moses, Elijah, Watu Gunung, Nyikang, Sigurd or Siegfried, Llew Llawgyffes, Arthur, and Robin Hood. Oedipus earns the highest score with 21 marks. The pattern has been applied to other heroes including Beowulf and Harry Potter.

Significantly, Raglan excludes Jesus from the study, even though Jesus matched a number of the identified traits. Raglan later claimed to have omitted Jesus to avoid conflict with his publisher. 

An outspoken atheist and active humanist, in the 1960s, Raglan was among the MPs and peers who established the All-Party Parliamentary Humanist Group in the British Parliament. He was a member of the British Humanist Association, serving on its advisory council.

Bibliography
Jocasta's Crime: An Anthropological Study, Methuen (London), 1933, Fertig (New York, NY), 1991
The Science of Peace, Methuen, 1933, reprinted by Pierides Press, 2007 
If I Were Dictator, Methuen, 1934 (contributor)
The Hero: A Study in Tradition, Myth and Drama, Methuen, 1936, reprinted by Dover Publications, 2011 
How Came Civilisation?, Methuen, 1939
Death and Rebirth, C. A. Watts, 1945
The Origins of Religion, C. A. Watts, 1949
(With Cyril Fox) Monmouthshire Houses, Parts I-III, National Museum of Wales, 1951–54 
The Temple and the House, Routledge & Kegan Paul, 1964, Norton (New York, NY), 1965

References

1885 births
1964 deaths
Amateur anthropologists
People educated at Sandroyd School
Barons in the Peerage of the United Kingdom
British atheists
British humanists
British anthropologists
British male writers
Graduates of the Royal Military College, Sandhurst
Grenadier Guards officers
Lord-Lieutenants of Monmouthshire
People educated at Eton College
Fellows of the Royal Anthropological Institute of Great Britain and Ireland
Presidents of the Royal Anthropological Institute of Great Britain and Ireland
FitzRoy Somerset, 4th Baron Raglan
Eldest sons of British hereditary barons
20th-century anthropologists
Presidents of the Folklore Society